The Silwerskerm Film Festival, usually called the Silwerskerm Fees, is a film festival held annually in Camps Bay, South Africa. The festival has been held every August since 2010 and is one of the only Afrikaans film festivals in the world.

With around 5000 tickets sold and 6500 admissions each year, it is considered as a niche Afrikaans film festival. Up to 30 films are shown in several sections across cinematic genres. Around six films compete for the festival's top feature length awards, and around fifteen short films are in competition.

Silwerskerm Award for Best Feature Film

Silwerskerm Award for Best Short Film

References

Film festivals in South Africa
Festivals in Cape Town